The 2007 FIA European Touring Car Cup was the third running of the  FIA European Touring Car Cup. It was held on 28 October 2007 at the Adria International Raceway near Adria in Italy.

Teams and drivers

Final standings

References

External links
Official website of the FIA European Touring Car Cup

2007
2007 in motorsport
2007 in Austrian motorsport
2007 in European sport
2007 in Italian motorsport